Kevin Harkin (born 30 January 1952) is an English former professional rugby league footballer who played in the 1960s, 1970s and 1980s.

Background
Kevin Harkin's birth was registered in Wakefield, West Riding of Yorkshire, England.

Playing career

Representative appearances
Kevin Harkin played in Wide Bay Division's match against Great Britain in the 1974 Great Britain Lions tour tour match.

Championship final appearances
Kevin Harkin played in Hull FC's 8–23 defeat by Widnes the Premiership Final during the 1981–82 season at Headingley Rugby Stadium, Leeds on Saturday 15 May 1982, in front of a crowd of 12,100.

Challenge Cup Final appearances
Kevin Harkin played  (Tony Dean played in the replay) in Hull FC's 14–14 draw with Widnes in the 1982 Challenge Cup Final during the 1981–82 season at Wembley Stadium, London on Saturday 1 May 1982, in front of a crowd of 92,147, and played  (replaced by  interchange/substitute, i.e. number 14, Terry Day, following a collision with Featherstone Rovers' Terry Hudson) in the 12–14 defeat by Featherstone Rovers in the 1983 Challenge Cup Final during the 1982–83 season at Wembley Stadium, London on Saturday 7 May 1983, in front of a crowd of 84,969.

County Cup Final appearances
Kevin Harkin played  in Hull FC's 18–7 victory over Bradford Northern in the 1982 Yorkshire County Cup Final during the 1982–83 season at Elland Road, Leeds on Saturday 2 October 1982.

Players No.6/John Player Trophy Final appearances
Kevin Harkin played  in Wakefield Trinity's 11–22 defeat by Halifax in the 1971–72 Players No.6 Trophy Final during the 1971–72 season at Odsal Stadium, Bradford on Saturday 22 January 1972, in front of a crowd of 7,975, and played as an  interchange/substitute (replacing  Tony Dean) in Hull FC's 12–4 victory over Hull Kingston Rovers in the 1981–82 John Player Trophy Final during the 1981–82 season at Headingley Rugby Stadium, Leeds on Saturday 23 January 1982.

Notable tour matches
Kevin Harkin played in York's 2-29 defeat by Australia at Clarence Street, York on Tuesday 14 November 1978, under temporary floodlights.

Club career
During his time at Wakefield Trinity he scored fifteen 3-point tries and, one 4-point try.

Genealogical information
Kevin Harkin is the cousin of the rugby league footballers; Paul Harkin and Terry Harkin.

Honoured at York
Kevin Harkin is a York 'Hall of Fame' inductee.

Outside rugby league
Kevin Harkin was the Landlord of The Weavers Arms, 33 Storrs Hill Road, Ossett, Wakefield.

References

External links
 (archived by web.archive.org) Statistics at hullfc.com

1952 births
Living people
English rugby league players
Hull F.C. players
Publicans
Rugby league five-eighths
Rugby league halfbacks
Rugby league players from Wakefield
Wakefield Trinity players
York Wasps players